Seven Devils Lake is a small reservoir in South Arkansas, It is located about  out of Monticello, Arkansas. The Lake is formed by Seven Devils Dam. The area got its name after a man that was trapped in the area for days finally made it out, a reporter asked if he found the rumored seven lakes of the area, the man then stated that there was not any seven lakes, but seven devils. This area is to be the most northern point west of the Mississippi River where American alligators can be found.

Seven Devils Swamp Wildlife Management Area is also located near the lake. The project includes  of wetlands, cypress forest, and timberlands. The project was made to protect the remains of the wetlands that have been draining for the past 100 years. The area is mainly controlled by the Arkansas Game and Fish Commission. Seven Devils Swamp WMA provides the benefit of migration, breeding, and public hunting.

See also 
List of Arkansas dams and reservoirs

External links
Sevin Devils Lake

Protected areas of Drew County, Arkansas
Reservoirs in Arkansas
Buildings and structures in Drew County, Arkansas
Bodies of water of Drew County, Arkansas